Mall of the Emirates metro station  is a rapid transit station on the Red Line of the Dubai Metro in Dubai, UAE.

The station opened on 9 September 2009. It is connected directly to the Mall of the Emirates by an enclosed overhead walkway.

Platform layout

References

Railway stations in the United Arab Emirates opened in 2009
Dubai Metro stations